is a 1956 Japanese B movie directed by Seijun Suzuki for the Nikkatsu Corporation. It is Suzuki's first film, credited under his given name Seitarō Suzuki. The film was primarily a vehicle for an already popular song.

References

External links
 Japan Foundation notes at Cinefiles
 
 
 Victory Is Mine  at the Japanese Movie Database

1956 films
Japanese black-and-white films
1950s Japanese-language films
Films directed by Seijun Suzuki
Nikkatsu films
1956 directorial debut films
1950s Japanese films
Japanese musical drama films
1950s musical drama films